The voiced velar affricate is a type of consonantal sound, used in very few spoken languages. The tie bar may be omitted, yielding  in the IPA and gG in X-SAMPA.

The voiced velar affricate has not been reported to occur phonemically in any language, but it is reported  as an allophone of /g/ (usually realized as a voiced velar plosive) in some dialects of English English.

Features 
Features of the voiced velar affricate:

Occurrence

Notes

References

External links
 

Affricates
Pulmonic consonants
Voiced oral consonants
Velar consonants
Central consonants